Claude Addas is a French-Polish scholar of Islam who has made major contributions to the field of Ibn Arabi studies.

Biography 

Claude Addas is the daughter of the Islamic scholar Michel Chodkeiwicz. Addas earned a degree in Arabic and Persian.

She is the author of the 1989 book Ibn ʻArabī, ou, La quête du soufre rouge, a biography of Ibn Arabi, which was translated into English by Peter Kingsley as Quest for the Red Sulphur: The Life on Ibn 'Arabi and published in 1993. William Chittick described Quest for the Red Sulphur as "the best and most thoroughly documented account" of Ibn Arabi's life. Gregory Lipton described her as "Ibn Arabi's preeminent Western biographer".

She is also the author of Ibn Arabî et le voyage sans retour, which was translated into English as Ibn 'Arabi: The Voyage of No Return.

Works 

 Ibn ʻArabī, ou, La quête du soufre rouge. Gallimard, 1989, ISBN 2070715043
 Ibn Arabî et le voyage sans retour, Le Seuil 1996, ISBN 9782020251266
 La Maison muhammadienne: Aperçus de la dévotion au Prophète en mystique musulmane, Gallimard, 2015, ISBN 2070147630

Works translated to English 

 Quest for the Red Sulphur: The Life of Ibn 'Arabi. Islamic Texts Society, 1993, ISBN 0946621454
 Ibn 'Arabi: The Voyage of No Return. Islamic Texts Society, 2000, ISBN 0946621748

References 

Living people
French Muslims
Scholars of Sufism
French scholars of Islam
French people of Polish descent
Women scholars of Islam
French women academics
Year of birth missing (living people)
Ibn Arabi scholars
Traditionalist School
Muslim scholars of Islamic studies